Michel Bernard may refer to:
Michel Bernard (runner) (1931–2019), French Olympic runner
Michel Bernard (politician) (1932–2021), French politician
Michel Bernard (administrator) (born 1943), French administrator
Michel Bernard (writer) (born 1958), French senior official and writer

See also 
Michel-Marie-Bernard Calvet (born 1944), French-born New Caledonian archbishop